David Goffin was the defending champion, but chose not to participate, since he played at French Open during that week.

Paolo Lorenzi won the tournament, defeating Íñigo Cervantes in the final. Lorenzi's quarterfinal match was his 300th win on the ATP Challenger Tour.

Seeds

Draw

Finals

Top half

Bottom half

References

External links
 Main Draw
 Qualifying Draw

Eskisehir Cup - Singles
2015 Singles